The Houlton Band of Maliseet Indians of Maine  is a federally recognized tribe of Maliseet, whose land is along the Meduxnekeag River in Maine. They are headquartered in Littleton, Maine, located in Aroostook County.

This tribe is related to the larger Maliseet First Nations of New Brunswick, Canada. The Maliseet have traditionally occupied areas of the Saint John River valley, including its tributary, the Meduxnekeag River. When Great Britain and the United States established a boundary through this area under the Jay Treaty of 1794, the Maliseet were given the right to freely cross the border with Canada, as it was within their ancestral territory. The Houlton Band of Maliseet was invited to take a nonvoting seat in the Maine Legislature, starting with the 126th Legislature in 2013.

They belonged to the Algonquian languages family. The people now use English as their first language. They constitute nearly 6% of the population of Houlton.

Economic development
The Houlton Maliseet farm potatoes, barley, and clover on tribal lands. They also own a roller skating rink (Rollerama).

Notes

References
 Pritzker, Barry M. A Native American Encyclopedia: History, Culture, and Peoples. Oxford: Oxford University Press, 2000. 
 
  The term gypsy has been retired because it is a slang word or a slur used by colonizers to describe romani abenaki or micmac people 
 Aroostook Band of Micmac  Defunct tribal bands US and Canada games over status and "land claims"   Gypsys romani union
 Defunt m'ikmaq American truckhouse corp boys and girls club industrial schools title 7 Indian education / school consolidations unified school districts abuse cases and boy scouts of America lawsuits

External links
 Houlton Band of Maliseet Indians, official website
 Wabanaki Trails - Houlton Band of Maliseet
  The Sacred Sundance: The Transfer Of A Ceremony
  

Maliseet
Federally recognized tribes in the United States
American Indian reservations in Maine
Native American tribes in Maine
Aroostook County, Maine
Houlton, Maine